Dum Dum Motijheel Rabindra Mahavidyalaya, established in 1968, is a general degree college in Kolkata. It offers undergraduate courses in arts and commerce.  It is affiliated to West Bengal State University.

Departments

Commerce and Arts

Commerce (Accounting & Finance and Marketing Hons. and General)
Bengali
Education (Hons. and General) 
English
History
Geography
Journalism

Accreditation
Dum Dum Motijheel Rabindra Mahavidyalaya is recognized by the University Grants Commission (UGC).

See also
Dum Dum Motijheel Girls' High School
Education in India
List of colleges in West Bengal
Education in West Bengal

References

External links
Dum Dum Motijheel Rabindra Mahavidyalaya

Universities and colleges in North 24 Parganas district
Colleges affiliated to West Bengal State University
Memorials to Rabindranath Tagore
Educational institutions established in 1968
1968 establishments in West Bengal